Suraj Lata Devi Waikhom (born 3 January 1981 in Manipur) is the former captain of the India women's national field hockey team and hails from Manipur.

She led the team to the Gold for three consecutive years: during the 2002 Commonwealth Games (the event which inspired the 2007 Bollywood hit film, Chak De India), the 2003  Afro-Asian Games, and the 2004 Hockey Asia Cup.

References 
Biography
Commonwealth Games Biography
Mothers’ Day Out on the BHA turf 

1981 births
Living people
Field hockey players from Manipur
Recipients of the Arjuna Award
Indian female field hockey players
Field hockey players at the 2002 Commonwealth Games
Commonwealth Games gold medallists for India
Sportswomen from Manipur
Field hockey players at the 1994 Asian Games
Field hockey players at the 1998 Asian Games
Field hockey players at the 2002 Asian Games
Medalists at the 1998 Asian Games
Asian Games medalists in field hockey
Asian Games silver medalists for India
Commonwealth Games medallists in field hockey
21st-century Indian women
21st-century Indian people
Medallists at the 2002 Commonwealth Games